Events in the year 1915 in Belgium.

Incumbents
Monarch: Albert I
Prime Minister: Charles de Broqueville

Events
 22 April - 25 May – Second Battle of Ypres

Publications
 Reports of the Belgian representatives in Berlin, London and Paris to the Minister of Foreign Affairs in Brussels, 1905-1914: European politics during the decade before the war as described by Belgian diplomatists.
 Isabel Anderson, The Spell of Belgium (Boston)
 Maurice Maeterlinck et al., Belgium, Hero and Martyr: Visé, Liége, Dinant, Termonde, Louvain, Malines, Nieuport, Ypres, Dixmude, Furnes, 1914-1915 (Paris)
 Pierre Nothomb, The Barbarians in Belgium, translated by Jean E.H. Findlay, with a preface by Henry Carton de Wiart (London, Jarrold & sons)
 Edward Neville Vose, The Spell of Flanders: An Outline of the History, Legends and Art of Belgium's Famous Northern Provinces (Boston, The Page Company)

Births
 22 May - Raymond Leblanc, comic book publisher and film producer (d. 2008)
 6 July - Marcel Quinet, composer and pianist (d. 1986)

Deaths
 12 October – Edith Cavell (born 1865), nurse

References

 
1910s in Belgium
Years of the 20th century in Belgium
Belgium
Belgium